Charles Bardeen may refer to:

 Charles William Bardeen (1847–1924), American educator
 Charles Russell Bardeen (1871–1935), American anatomist, first dean of the medical school of the University of Wisconsin-Madison
 Charles V. Bardeen (1850–1903), American jurist